Kettle Island is an unincorporated community and coal town in Bell County, Kentucky, United States. Kettle Island has a post office with ZIP code 40958, which opened on March 15, 1912. The community also had a station on the Louisville and Nashville Railroad.

There are two possible explanations for the community's name. The first is that early settlers did laundry in a common kettle on an island in Straight Creek. The second is that hunters used an iron kettle on the same island as a landmark.

In 1930, an explosion at the Pioneer Mine in Kettle Island killed 16 miners.

References

Unincorporated communities in Bell County, Kentucky
Unincorporated communities in Kentucky
Coal towns in Kentucky